New Historical Option (NOI), formerly known as the Romanian National Party (PNR), is a political party in Moldova.

History 

New Historical Option, then known as the Romanian National Party, participated in the parliamentary elections of 1994 and 2001. At the 2003 local election and 2005 parliamentary election, it did not participate. However, it participated, now under its current name since 2013, at the 2021 parliamentary election.

Former names 
 "Asociația Foștilor Deținuți Politici și Victime ale Represiunilor din Moldova" (AFDP VRM) [19.02.1992 – 09.01.1994]
 "Asociația Victimelor Regimului Comunist de Ocupație și a Veteranilor de Război ai Armatei Române" (AVRCO VRAR) [09.01.1994 – 11.06.2000] 
 "Partidul Național Român" (PNR) [11.06.2000 – 30.03.2013]

Gallery

See also 
 List of political parties in Moldova

References

 Partidul politic "Noua Opțiune Istorică" (NOI) 

Political parties in Moldova
Political history of Moldova
Anti-communist parties
Anti-communism in Moldova